Gregory Kenneth Larson  (born November 15, 1939) is a former American football center in the National Football League (NFL) for the New York Giants.  He played college football at the University of Minnesota and was drafted in the sixth round of the 1961 NFL Draft.  Larson was also selected in the eleventh round of the 1961 AFL Draft by the San Diego Chargers.

A three-year letterman, he was a team captain and All-Big Ten selection when the Golden Gophers won the National Championship in 1960. He was inducted into the university's M Club Hall of Fame in 2010.

Larson announced his retirement as an active player on May 17, 1974 after 13 seasons as the Giants' starting center. He played in 179 games which at the time was second in team history to Joe Morrison.  He missed only three games despite seven football-related operations, including two on each knee.

References

1939 births
Living people
American football centers
Minnesota Golden Gophers football players
New York Giants players
Eastern Conference Pro Bowl players
Players of American football from Minneapolis